Omid Samkan (born 26 April 1996) is an Iranian football defender, who plays for Sepidrood Rasht in Persian Gulf Pro League.

Club career

Sepidrood
He made his debut for Sepidrood Rasht in 6th fixtures of 2017–18 Persian Gulf Pro League against Sanat Naft Abadan.

References

Living people
1996 births
Iranian footballers
Sepidrood Rasht players
People from Tehran
Association football defenders